"James Hatley" is Child Ballad 244, existing in several variants.  It appears to have no historical basis. The ballad tells the story of a man who steals a king's keys. The identity of the man and his fate differ depending on the ballad's variation.

Synopsis

The ballad has several variants. A villain—Sir Fenwick, False Fennick, or fause Phenix—steals the king's jewels.  He lays the blame on James Hatley or Jamie O’Lee. In one variant, the king's daughter steals the keys to ask him whether he did it.  Accepting his word, she arranges for a trial by combat.  James kills Fenwick, who confesses while dying.  The king's daughter offers to marry him.

In another, he is the page to the king's son.  He appeals to the prince, who fights for him.  False Fennick confesses, and the prince resolves to give his lands to James.

In a third, the king's son escorts him to the trial by combat, because he does not trust fause Phenix.  James fights and kills him.  He confesses before he dies.  The royal family promise him appointments and lands; James declares he would rather be the prince's page.  The king dresses him richly for the role.

In both versions where James fights, the ballad observes that James is fifteen and the thief in his thirties, making the triumph remarkable.

Motifs
The negotiations over his release resemble those of "Hughie Graham".

See also 
 English folklore

References 

Child Ballads
British folklore
Year of song unknown